Allocasuarina acutivalvis is a shrub or tree of the genus Allocasuarina native to the Wheatbelt, Goldfields-Esperance and Mid West regions of Western Australia.

It produces brown flowers and is found in tall, open woodland and rocky hillsides.

The species was first formally described as Casuarina acutivalvis by the botanist Ferdinand von Mueller in 1867 in the work Fragmenta Phytographiae Australiae. It was reclassified in 1982 into the genus Allocasuarina by Lawrence Alexander Sidney Johnson in the Journal of the Adelaide Botanic Gardens.

References

acutivalvis
Rosids of Western Australia
Fagales of Australia
Plants described in 1867
Taxa named by Ferdinand von Mueller
Dioecious plants